Popular Unity was a political and electoral alliance in Spain. The alliance was organized in 2015 to contest the 2015 general election and integrates the United Left. Alberto Garzón was its lead candidate. In the 2015 election, it won two seats in the 350 seat Congress of Deputies.

Composition

Electoral performance

Congress of Deputies

Senate

References

2015 establishments in Spain
Defunct left-wing political party alliances
Defunct political party alliances in Spain
Political parties established in 2015
Republican parties in Spain
Unidas Podemos
Spain
United Left (Spain)